The GWF Television Championship was a secondary title in the Global Wrestling Federation in Texas. The title existed from 1991 until 1993, when it was abandoned. The title was defended on the promotion's show that aired nationally on ESPN.

Title history

Tournaments

June 1991
The GWF Television Championship Tournament was a twenty-four man tournament for the inaugural GWF Television Championship held on June 29 and June 30, 1991. The Patriot defeated Buddy Landel in the final to win the tournament.

October 1991
The GWF Television Championship Tournament was a six-man tournament held for the vacated GWF Television Championship on October 4, 1991 after previous champion The Patriot vacated the title upon winning the GWF North American Heavyweight Championship on August 23. Eddie Gilbert won the tournament by defeating Handsome Stranger in the final.

Footnotes

References

See also
Global Wrestling Federation

Global Wrestling Federation championships
Television wrestling championships